Macrobaenetes valgum, the Coachella giant sand treader cricket, is a species of insect in family Rhaphidophoridae. It is endemic to the United States.

References

Insects of the United States
Rhaphidophoridae
Insects described in 1960
Taxonomy articles created by Polbot